Crewkerne Castle (which is also known as Castle Hill or Croft Castle) was possibly a Norman motte and bailey castle on a mound that is situated north-west of the town of Crewkerne in Somerset, England.

Details

Archaeological and geophysical research has found a ditch around the hilltop, with a masonry square within it, while fragments of 12th century pottery have been found on the site. One theory is that this is a Norman motte; another that it is a 13th-century manor house;  alternatively it may be simply have been a local folly.

The manor had been granted to Richard de Redvers by Henry I by the year 1107 and it is thought that his son Baldwin built on the hill. In 1150 the Bishop of Salisbury was given the services of knights associated with the castle.

See also
Castles in Great Britain and Ireland
List of castles in Somerset

References

Further reading
Fry, Plantagenet Somerset, The David & Charles Book of Castles, David & Charles, 1980. 

Castle
Castles in Somerset